Bárcenas may refer to these people:

Alejandro Barcenas, Venezuelan philosopher
Édgar Yoel Bárcenas, Panamanian international footballer
Luis Bárcenas, Spanish politician
Loretta Barcenas, Filipino sprinter

It can also refer to the Bárcenas affair, a major corruption case in Spain with Luis Bárcenas as a major actor.